Bruno Padulazzi (September 3, 1927 in Lesa – February 27, 2005 in Lesa) was an Italian professional football player.

Honours
 Serie A champion: 1952/53, 1953/54.

1927 births
2005 deaths
Italian footballers
Serie A players
Serie B players
A.C. Legnano players
S.S.D. Lucchese 1905 players
Inter Milan players
Torino F.C. players
Association football defenders
A.C.D. Trissino-Valdagno players
A.C. Gozzano players